Gregory Lamar Richardson (born October 6, 1964) is a former American football wide receiver in the National Football League who played for the Minnesota Vikings and Tampa Bay Buccaneers.

Early life and education
Richardson was born and raised in Mobile, Alabama, and attended Lillie B. Williamson High School there.

While attending University of Alabama, he played college football for the Crimson Tide football team. He was a starter on the time for three years, and he lettered in all four.

Career

Professional athlete
Richardson was drafted in the sixth round of the 1987 NFL Draft by the Minnesota Vikings and played two games for them his rookie year. The following year, he played two games for the Tampa Bay Buccaneers.

Post-athletic career

Richardson has worked for the Mobile County Department of Public Works.

Personal life
Richardson is married. He has five children including a set of twins.

References

1964 births
Living people
American football wide receivers
American football return specialists
Minnesota Vikings players
Tampa Bay Buccaneers players
Alabama Crimson Tide football players